Sankuaicuo is a railway station in Sanmin District, Kaohsiung, Taiwan.

History
The southern Taiwan railway project began near the beginning of Japanese rule in 1908. It was subsequently replaced by a then-permanent station building in 1923.

Sankuaicuo was closed to passengers in 1962 due to falling passenger numbers, however goods handling continued at the station until it was finally closed on 26 September 1986. The permanent way between Sankuaicuo and Kaohsiung Port was removed between July 1990 and November 1995. On 9 September 2004, the Kaohsiung City Government designated the old Sankuaicuo station building as a historical site.

A new station was built and opened on 14 October 2018 as part of the underground relocation of railway tracks in Kaohsiung.

Architecture
The station building was built with bricks, cement and mortar. It is covered with washed stone.

See also
 List of tourist attractions in Taiwan
 Qishan Train Station

References

1908 establishments in Taiwan
1986 disestablishments in Taiwan
Buildings and structures in Kaohsiung
Railway stations opened in 1908
Railway stations closed in 1986
Tourist attractions in Kaohsiung
Transport infrastructure completed in 2018